Jean-Baptiste Mondino (born Aubervilliers, France on 21 July 1949) is a French fashion photographer and music video director. He has directed music videos for Madonna, David Bowie, Sting, Björk, Don Henley, Neneh Cherry, Axel Bauer and Les Rita Mitsouko.  Mondino has also photographed the covers and album packaging for the Marianne Faithfull albums Before The Poison (2005) and Easy Come, Easy Go  (2008), Shakespear's Sister's Hormonally Yours (1992), Alain Bashung's Osez Joséphine (1991), Chatterton (1994), Mylène Farmer's Désobéissance (2018), J.'s We Are the Majority (1992) and Prince's Lovesexy (1988). He also designed the titles for the Anglo-French TV music show Rapido.  

The video for Don Henley's "The Boys of Summer", which Mondino directed, swept the MTV Video Music Awards in 1985, winning "Best Video", "Best Direction", "Best Art Direction" and "Best Cinematography". This video paired him with compatriot cinematographer, Pascal Lebègue, with whom he would later shoot several other notable music videos in black and white, such as "Russians" for Sting and "Justify My Love" for Madonna.

Music video filmography

See also 
 Fashion
 Fashion on the Internet

References

External links
Official website
Mondino Monde: The Work Of Jean-Baptiste Mondino

Watch Mondino's video for C'est comme ça (Les Rita Mitsouko)
Interview with Lumiere magazine

1949 births
Living people
People from Aubervilliers
Fashion photographers 
French music video directors
French photographers